Sónoman (Sonoman) is a superhero created in Argentina by Osvaldo Walter Viola ("Oswal"). The first release was December 15, 1966. His power was the poder Músico-Mental (Mental-Music Power in English). This power allowed him to have the strength of "three ramming rhinos", move transformed into a sound wave and produce deafening sounds. It was published for ten years in various magazines.

Sources

Official website of the author

Other pages

Comics superheroes
Argentine comic strips
Latin American superheroes
Male superheroes